Emilè Azar (born in Beirut, Lebanon on 2 May 1985) is a Swedish singer of Lebanese origin, and a resident of Sandviken, Sweden. He sent in a song to Melodifestivalen and got a spot on the show in a bid to represent Sweden in the Eurovision Song Contest 2007, receiving media attention because of his massive weight loss after getting a spot in Melodifestivalen.

On 24 February 2007, Emilé Azar performed the song "Vi hade nåt" (meaning We had something) in Melodifestivalen 2007 and ended up in 7th place and did not make it any further in the contest.

Discography
2007: "Vi hade nåt" (in Melodifestivalen 2007

References

External links
Last.fm

1985 births
Living people
Lebanese emigrants to Sweden
Musicians from Beirut
21st-century Swedish singers
21st-century Swedish male singers
Melodifestivalen contestants of 2007
Melodifestivalen contestants of 2006